Bruno Emiliano Centeno (born 8 August 1988) is an Argentine footballer currently playing for San Martín de Burzaco of the Primera C Nacional in Argentina. He also participated in the Argentina Under-20 team that won the 2007 FIFA U-20 World Cup tournament in Canada.

Teams
  San Lorenzo 2007-2010
  Almagro 2011–2017 
  Almirante Brown (loan) 2014-2015
  Defensores de Belgrano (loan) 2016
  Gualaceo 2018
  Porvenir 2019
  Sportivo Italiano 2021-2022
  San Martín de Burzaco 2023-Present

Titles

References
 Profile at BDFA 

1988 births
Living people
Argentine footballers
Argentine expatriate footballers
Argentina international footballers
Argentina under-20 international footballers
Everton de Viña del Mar footballers
San Lorenzo de Almagro footballers
Club Almirante Brown footballers
Argentine Primera División players
Expatriate footballers in Chile
Association football goalkeepers